Mastiii is a Hindi language free to air music television channel. owmed by Sri Adhikari Brothers Television Network Ltd. it was among the top five channels in the Hindi music category after just one month of launch. Mastiii Bollywood music channel also available on DD Free dish DTH at channel number 62.

Programs
 Love Kal Aaj aur Kal
 Evergreen Hits
 Hit Hai Toh Bajega
 Just Mohabbat
 Mastiii Doubles
 Raat Ke Humsafar
 The Golden Era with Annu Kapoor
Morning Masti
Hit Melodies

References

External links
Official website

Music television channels in India
Television stations in Mumbai
Indian music mass media
Hindi-language television channels in India
Television channels and stations established in 2001
Sri Adhikari Brothers Television